John Treadway Rich (April 23, 1841 – March 28, 1926) was an American politician serving as a U.S. Representative and the 23rd governor of Michigan.

Early life in Pennsylvania, Vermont and Michigan
Rich was born in Conneautville, Pennsylvania, the son of John W. Rich and Jerusha Treadway Rich. John Treadway Rich's middle name is mistakenly given as "Tyler", perhaps because he was born just nineteen days after John Tyler became U.S. President upon the death of William Henry Harrison.  In 1846, he moved with his parents to Addison County, Vermont, and two years later they moved to Elba Township, Michigan. He attended the public schools and engaged in agricultural pursuits.  On March 12, 1863, he married Lucretia M. Winship.

Politics
Rich was a member and chairman of the board of supervisors of Lapeer County, 1869–1872. He was a member of the Michigan House of Representatives, 1873–1881, and served as speaker of the house during the last two terms.  He was also a delegate to the Republican State conventions in 1873, 1875, and 1878.

Rich served in the Michigan Senate from January 1, 1881, until March 21, 1881, when he resigned, having been elected to the United States House of Representatives for the 47th Congress to fill the vacancy caused by the resignation of Omar D. Conger, serving from April 5, 1881, to March 4, 1883. He was an unsuccessful candidate for reelection in 1882 to the 48th Congress. He later served as State Railroad Commissioner, 1887–1891, and a delegate to the Republican National Conventions in 1884 to elect James G. Blaine and 1892 to re-elect Benjamin Harrison as U.S. President, both of whom lost to Democrat Grover Cleveland.

Rich served as Governor of Michigan from 1893 to 1897. During his four years in office, a railroad strike, as well as an iron mine strike occurred. Also, three members of the State Canvassing Board were fired for falsifying returns on a salary raise vote for state officeholders.

After leaving office, he served as United States collector of customs at Detroit from February 16, 1898, to January 30, 1906. He was elected State Treasurer of Michigan to fill a vacancy and served from January 23, 1908, to January 1, 1909. He was then collector of customs at Port Huron from December 11, 1908, to May 30, 1913.

Death
Rich died in St. Petersburg, Florida, and is interred at Mount Hope Cemetery of Lapeer, Michigan.

References

The Political Graveyard
National Governors Association
John Treadway Rich papers, 1884-1914" Bentley Historical Library, University of Michigan, Ann Arbor, Michigan

1841 births
1926 deaths
People from Conneautville, Pennsylvania
Republican Party governors of Michigan
Speakers of the Michigan House of Representatives
Republican Party Michigan state senators
State treasurers of Michigan
Burials in Michigan
Republican Party members of the United States House of Representatives from Michigan
19th-century American politicians
20th-century American politicians